Events from the year 1711 in Great Britain.

Incumbents
 Monarch – Anne
 Parliament – 3rd

Events
 24 February – premiere of Rinaldo by George Frideric Handel, the first Italian opera written for the London stage, at the Queen's Theatre, Haymarket.
 1 March – first edition of the magazine The Spectator published.
 5 April (Easter Sunday) – the central tower of Elgin Cathedral in northeast Scotland collapses.
 22 May – Company of Blanket Weavers of Witney in Oxfordshire incorporated by royal charter to regulate the trade.
 23 May – Robert Harley made Earl of Oxford.
 29 May – Harley made Lord High Treasurer.
 7 August – capture of the galleon San Joaquin: Spanish galleon San Joaquin in a treasure fleet sailing from Cartagena de Indias (modern-day Colombia) to Spain surrenders after an engagement with five British ships.
 11 August – the first race meeting is held at Ascot Racecourse, "Her Majesty's Plate".
 22 August – the Quebec Expedition, a British attempt to attack Quebec as part of Queen Anne's War, fails when 8 of its ships are wrecked in the Saint Lawrence River and 850 soldiers drown, one of the worst disasters in British history up to this date.
 8 September – the South Sea Company receives a Royal Charter.
 12 September – Siege of Bouchain in the War of the Spanish Succession concludes with the last major victory for John Churchill, 1st Duke of Marlborough.
 14 October – Woodes Rogers returns to England after a successful round-the-world privateering cruise against Spain, carrying loot worth £150,000.
 5 November – the southwest spire of Southwell Minster in Nottinghamshire is struck by lightning, resulting in a fire that spreads to the nave and tower, destroying roofs, bells, clock and organ.
 7 December - The Earl of Nottingham successfully proposes an amendment in the House of Lords calling for "No Peace Without Spain".
 15 December – Occasional Conformity Act bars nonconformists and Roman Catholics from public office.
 25 December – the rebuilding of St Paul's Cathedral in London to a design by Sir Christopher Wren is declared complete by Parliament; Old St Paul's had been destroyed by the 1666 Great Fire of London.
 31 December – John Churchill, 1st Duke of Marlborough is replaced by James Butler, 2nd Duke of Ormonde as the Commander-in-Chief of the Forces.

Undated
 Commission for Building Fifty New Churches set up under terms of the New Churches in London and Westminster Act (1710).
 John Shore invents the tuning fork.
 Blast furnace for the production of charcoal iron erected at Backbarrow in the north west of England; it will be in production until the 1960s.

Publications

Prose

 Francis Atterbury, Representation of the State of Religion
 Anthony Ashley-Cooper, 3rd Earl of Shaftesbury, Characteristics of Men, Manners, Opinions, Times
 Daniel Defoe
 The British Visions
 An Essay on the History of Parties
 An Essay on the South-Sea Trade
 The Present State of the Parties in Great Britain (attributed)
 The Secret History of the October Club
 John Dennis, Reflections Critical and Satyrical, Upon a Late Rhapsody call'd, An Essay upon Criticism (Dennis's counterattack on Alexander Pope)

Poetry and Songs

 Sir Richard Blackmore, published anonymously, The Nature of Man
 William King, An Historical Account of the Heathen Gods and Heroes
 Alexander Pope, An Essay on Criticism
 James Watson, editor, Choice Collection of Comic and Serious Scots Poems, Edinburgh

Births
 7 May – David Hume, philosopher (died 1776)
 19 August – Edward Boscawen, admiral (died 1761)
 1 September – William Boyce, composer (died 1779)
 22 September – Thomas Wright, astronomer, mathematician, instrument maker, architect, garden designer, antiquary and genealogist (died 1786)
 26 September – Richard Grenville-Temple, 2nd Earl Temple, politician (died 1779)
 5 November – Catherine Raftor, later Kitty Clive, actress (died 1785)

Deaths
 19 March – Thomas Ken, bishop and hymn-writer (born 1637)
 2 May – Laurence Hyde, 1st Earl of Rochester, statesman (born 1641)
 6 July – James Douglas, 2nd Duke of Queensberry, politician (born 1662)
 25 August – Edward Villiers, 1st Earl of Jersey, politician (born c. 1656)

References

 
Years in Great Britain